Park Avenue Bridge may refer to:

 Park Avenue Bridge (Clifton, Arizona), listed on the NRHP in Arizona
 Park Avenue Bridge (New York City), an alternative name for the Harlem River Lift Bridge
 Park Avenue Viaduct, in New York City